Tacoma South is a suburb of the Central Coast region of New South Wales, Australia. It is part of the  local government area.

The suburb, which is primarily bushland, is bordered by Wyong River and Tuggerah Nature Reserve. There is only one way in and out of the suburb.

References

Suburbs of the Central Coast (New South Wales)